This is a list of programs currently and soon to be broadcast by Xbox Live; most are viewed via IPTV or video on demand applications (such as sporting events via the ESPN application), while others, such as Majors Minute, are streamed by Xbox Live. However, most events are not available in all regions.

Xbox Live original programming
 Blake's 7 (starting TBA)
 Every Street United (starting TBA)
 Halo: The Television Series (starting 2017)
 Humans (starting TBA)
 The LeBrons (2012–present)
 Life's Little Miracles (starting TBA)
 Miss United Continent (2013–present)
 The Music Box (2013–present)

News programs
 NBC Nightly News (2009–present)
 Today (2009–present)

Sports
Major League Baseball (2011–present)
National Basketball Association (2011–present)
National Football League (2013–present)
National Hockey League (2013–present)
Ultimate Fighting Championship (2011–present)
WWE (2013–present)

Association football
UEFA Euro: 2012, 2016
FIFA Confederations Cup: 2013
FIFA U-17 World Cup: 2011
FIFA U-20 World Cup: 2011
FIFA Women's World Cup: 2011
FIFA U-17 Women's World Cup: 2014
FIFA U-20 Women's World Cup: 2014
FIFA World Cup: 2014
Copa América: 2015, 2019, 2023, 2027

College football
ACC: 2011–present
Big Ten Conference: 2011–present
Big 12: 2011–present
Big East: 2011–present
Bowl Championship Series: January 2011–2014
Bowl games: 2010–present (contracts with individual bowl games; the first live college football game telecast on ESPN was the 1982 Independence Bowl, Kansas St. vs. Wisconsin)
Brigham Young University: 2011–present
C-USA: 2011–present
MAC: 2011–present
MEAC: 2011–present
NCAA Division I FCS (formerly Division I-AA), Division II, and Division III playoffs (selected games) and championship games.: 2011–present
Pac-12: 2011–present
SEC: 2011–present
Sun Belt: 2011–present
Turkey Day Classic: 2011–present
WAC: 2011–present

Tennis

Tennis Grand Slams
Australian Open (2011–present)
French Open (2011–present)
US Open (2011–present)
Wimbledon (2011–present)

Other
Xbox Live simulcasts the ATP Masters 1000 tournaments in Indian Wells, Miami, Toronto/Montreal and Cincinnati.

Beauty pageants
 Miss Teen USA (2012–present)

Music
American Top 40 (2012-present)

Family entertainment
Sesame Street (2012–present)
Tiny Toon Adventures (2010-present)

Former programs
On May 2, 2012, it was announced that Inside Xbox would be discontinued to focus more on its entertainment features.
 Major's Minute (2006–2012)
 Official Xbox Magazine (2007–2012)
 Sent U a Message (2008–2012)
 Xbox 101 (2008–2012)
 Insider Moves (2008–2012)
 IGN Strategize (2008–2012)
 Hot Apps (2010–2012)
 Tech With Tina (2010–2012)
 The Family Show (2010–2012)
 The Kinect Show (2010–2012)

References

Xbox Live
Xbox network
Xbox 360
Xbox One